The women's vault competition at the 2016 Summer Olympics in Rio de Janeiro, Brazil. The event was held at the HSBC Arena on 14 August.

The medals were presented by Larry Probst IOC member, and Nellie Kim, FIG Women's Artistic Gymnastics Technical Committee President.

Competition format
The top eight qualifiers in the qualification phase (limit two per NOC) advanced to the apparatus final. Qualification scores were then ignored, with only final round scores counting.  Each gymnast performed two vaults.

Qualification

Reserves

Final

Notable moments
Simone Biles was the first gymnast since Larisa Latynina at the 1956 Olympics to win team gold, AA gold and vault gold in succession. Dipa Karmakar made history as the first ever Indian gymnastics event finalist, male or female. Simone Biles is the first American to have won Olympic gold on the vault. Giulia Steingruber's bronze was the first Olympic medal for a native Swiss gymnast in 64 years, and the very first one for the country in women's gymnastics.

Hong Un-jong tried to perform the TTY (Triple Twisting Yurchenko) for the first time in female artistic gymnastic history, but she fell and was only credited with the 2.5 twist, or Amanar. It would have been valued with a 6.8 D-Score.

References

 https://www.olympic.org/rio-2016/gymnastics-artistic/vault-women
 https://www.bbc.co.uk/sport/olympics/rio-2016/results/sports/gymnastics/womens-vault

Women's vault
2016
2016 in women's gymnastics
Women's events at the 2016 Summer Olympics